Zaz is the debut studio album by French singer Zaz, released on 10 May 2010 by Play On and Sony Music. It spawned two singles, "Je veux" and "Le long de la route", which achieved success in Belgium (Wallonia). The album itself was a commercial success, reaching topping the charts in Francophone countries.

Background and writing
Zaz co-wrote six songs on the album, and French singer Raphaël Haroche wrote three songs.

Critical reception

Zaz received mixed reviews from musical critics. Le Figaro said the singer's voice "upsets and wins over". The editors admitted they were moved by "her small skinned side" and praised "the urban blues of "Trop sensible", or the upsetting "Port Coton" or songs with realistic accents such as "Ni oui ni non" or "Dans ma rue"". Libération stated that her single "Je veux" is "between 'J'veux du soleil' by Au P'tit Bonheur and the competitive 'P'tit kawa' by Karimouche—other examples of good-natured variety supercharged for optimism." The paper also wrote that "her natural sound—she is capable of laughing in the middle of a song—makes up for a rather simple technique, in the spirit of a jazz world not too concerned with such idiosyncrasies". Le Nouvel Observateur deemed "Je veux" a song with "anti-consumerism" lyrics that "immediately catches the ear". Le Parisien believed that her "songs with realistic lyrics marked the spirits... She reflects the mindset of youth, a bit tortured but full of hope". L'Humanité praised a "very direct and friendly link" between the young singer and her public, saying: "Welcome to Zaz's world of good mood".

More critical, Valérie Lehoux of Télérama argued that the singer has "unquestionably quite unusual vocal abilities", but considered her album as "too fragmented to be easily likeable, as we must navigate without a sextant from rather old-fashioned French songs to the free variety, to a more or less danceable neo-R&B." She added that the singer has demonstrated her singing abilities but her songs soon lose their attraction and collapse under "too cumbersome and too expected" references. Les Inrockuptibles gave a negative review of the album and of the lead single.

Track listing

Charts

Weekly charts

Year-end charts

Certifications

References

2010 debut albums
French-language albums
Sony Music France albums
Zaz (singer) albums
European Border Breakers Award-winning albums